El Jardin is a house located at 3747 Main Highway in Miami, Florida.  It is listed on the U.S. National Register of Historic Places. El Jardin is now home to  Carrollton School of the Sacred Heart in Miami, Florida. It was added to the U.S. National Register of Historic Places on August 30, 1974.

Built in 1918 along a ridge of oolitic limestone, El Jardin expresses the broad training of its architect, Richard Kiehnel of Kiehnel and Elliott, and the experience of its owner, John Bindley, then president of Pittsburgh Steel.  Kiehnel, in a September 1928 article for Tropical Home and Garden, referred to the house as a “progenitor of the Modern Mediterranean style home.” Kiehnel relocated to Miami from Pittsburgh and became the architect for many landmark buildings, including the Coral Gables Congregational Church, Miami Senior High, and the Coral Gables Elementary School.

References

External links

 

 Miami-Dade County listings at National Register of Historic Places
 Dade County listings at Florida's Office of Cultural and Historical Programs

Buildings and structures in Miami
History of Miami
National Register of Historic Places in Miami
Houses in Miami-Dade County, Florida
Kiehnel and Elliott buildings
1918 establishments in Florida
Houses completed in 1918